The 2014 ISL Inaugural Domestic Draft was the first ever draft from the Indian Super League, the new franchise domestic football league in India. The draft featured eighty-four Indian domestic players. They were drafted by six out of the eight franchises featured in the Indian Super League to form the domestic core of the teams. NorthEast United FC and Goa were the two non-participating teams as they selected their Indian players from both I-League teams, Dempo and Shillong Lajong respectively. Forty of the eighty-four players up for selection have either played for the India national team or have attended a camp for the national team.

The draft took place within two days, 22 to 23 July, in Mumbai.

Players available to draft

Main pool

Reserves

Draft selections – Day 1

Round 1
The first round saw FC Pune City go first, with them selecting Lenny Rodrigues as the first ever Indian player in ISL history.

Round 2
The second round saw Delhi Dynamos FC go first, with them selecting Robert Lalthlamuana as their pick.

Round 3
The third round saw Kerala Blasters FC pick first. The player they selected was Ishfaq Ahmed.

Round 4
The fourth round saw Mumbai pick first, their pick being Raju Gaikwad.

Round 5
The fifth round saw Chennai pick first. They selected Shilton Paul with their pick.

Round 6
The sixth round saw Atlético de Kolkata pick first. They selected Mohammed Rafi with their pick.

Round 7
The sixth round saw FC Pune City pick first. They selected Israil Gurung with their pick.

Draft selections – Day 2

Round 8
The first round of the second day and the eighth round overall began with Delhi Dynamos FC drafting Adil Khan.

Round 9
The second round of the second day and the ninth round overall began with Kerala Blasters FC drafting Sandip Nandy.

Round 10
The third round of the second day and the tenth round overall began with Mumbai drafting Nadong Bhutia.

Round 11
The fourth round of the second day and the eleventh round overall began with Chennai drafting Anthony Barbosa.

Round 12
The fifth round of the second day and the twelfth round overall began with Atlético de Kolkata drafting Baljit Sahni.

Round 13
The sixth round of the second day and the thirteenth round overall began with Atlético de Kolkata drafting Climax Lawrence.

Round 14
The seventh round of the second day and the fourteenth round overall began with Chennai drafting Jaison Vales.

Goa and North East United
Due to both Goa and North East United FC technically not being a part of the official draft, the two teams were placed at the bottom for every round to select their one player from Dempo and Shillong Lajong, respectively, from the I-League.

References

Draft
Domestic draft
Indian Super League drafts
Association football player non-biographical articles
ISL Inaugural Domestic Draft
ISL Inaugural Domestic Draft
2010s in Mumbai
Football in Mumbai
Events in Mumbai